This is a list of German television related events from 1954.

Events
4 July - West Germany beat Hungary 3-2 to win the 1954 World Cup at Bern, Switzerland.

Debuts

ARD
 4 March - Kinderbücher für Erwachsene (1954-1955)
 2 April - Vater Seidl und sein Sohn (1954)
 31 July - Der Hauptfilm hat noch nicht begonnen... (1954-1956)
 15 September -  (1954-1960)
 30 November - Die Galerie der großen Detektive (1954)

Television shows

1950s
Tagesschau (1952–present)

References